71st Regiment may refer to:

 71st Regiment of Foot (1758), former British Army regiment, 1758–1763
 71st Regiment of Foot, Fraser's Highlanders, former British Army regiment, raised for the American Revolution, 1775–1786
 71st (Highland) Regiment of Foot, former British Army regiment, active in 1777–1881
 71 (Yeomanry) Signal Regiment, British Territorial Army regiment established in 1969
 71st Coorg Rifles, British Indian Army regiment, active in 1767–1904
 71st Infantry Regiment (Greece), Hellenic Army regiment established in 1940
 71st Infantry Regiment (New York), New York State Guard regiment established in 1850
 71st Air Defense Artillery Regiment (United States), US Army regiment established in 1918
 71st Infantry Regiment (United States), former US Army regiment, active in 1918–1919
 71st Cavalry Regiment (United States), US Army regiment established in 1941

American Civil war
 71st Illinois Volunteer Infantry Regiment, Union Army regiment 
 71st Ohio Infantry, Union Army regiment 
 71st Pennsylvania Infantry, Union Army regiment
 71st United States Colored Infantry Regiment, Union Army regiment